Kinkaid  is a surname. Notable people with the surname include:

Keith Kinkaid (born 1989), American ice hockey goaltender
Mary Holland Kinkaid (1861—1948), American novelist and journalist
Moses Kinkaid (1856–1922), American politician
Thomas C. Kinkaid (1888–1972), American admiral